Ashok Bhadra is an Indian composer working in the Bollywood and Bengali film industries. He has also worked for albums like Shudhu Ektu Bhalobasa and Paroshmani.

Discography

As a music director 

 Rakhal Raja (1995)
 Tomake Chai (1997)
 Sabar Upare Maa (1997)
 Nishpap Asami (1997)
 Shimul Parul (1998)
 Naag Nagini (1998)
 Kamalar Banabas (1998)
 Nayaner Alo (1998)
 Madhu Malati (1999)
 Kanchanmala (1999)
 Gariber Raja Robinhood  (1999)
 Satbhai (2000)
 Ei Ghar Ei Sansar (2000)
 Bhalobashar Chhoan (2000)
 Suorani Duorani (2001)
 Ostad (2001)
 Jabab Chai (2001)
 Shatrur Mokabila (2002)
 Kurukshetra (2002)
 Sneher Protidan (2003)
 Sabuj Saathi (2003)
 Mayer Anchal (2003)
 Kartabya (2003)
 Tyaag (2004)
 Tista Parer Kanya (2004)
 Sajani (2004)
 Raja Babu (2004)
 Pratishodh (2004)
 Paribar (2004)
 Coolie (2004)
 Badsha The King (2004)
 Agni (2004)
 Sangram (2005)
 Rajmohol (2005)
 Debi (2005)
 Dadar Adesh (2005)
 Chore Chore Mastuto Bhai (2005)
 Bazi (2005)
 Swarthopar (2006)
 Shakal Sandhya (2006)
 Agnipariksha (2006)
 Abhimanyu (2006)
 Shikar (2006)
 Prem(2007)
 Narir Samman (2007)
 Mahaguru (2007)
 Jiban Sathi (2007)
 Aloy Phera (2007)
 Takkar (2008)
 Golmaal (2008)
 Janmadata (2008)
 Blood (2008)
 Rajkumar (2008)
 Chaowa Pawa (2009)
 Ei Prithibi Tomar Aamar (2009)
 Jamai Raja (2009)
 Swartha (2009)
 Bhalobasa Jindabad (2009)
 Phire Pete Chai (2009)
 Bhalobasa Jug Jug Jiyo (2009)
 Bela Sheshe (2009)
 Pratidwandi (2010)
 Love Circus (2010)
 Simanto Periye (2010)
 Bor Bou Khela (2010)
 Joy Baba Bholenath (2010)
 Kakhono Biday Bolo Na (2010)
 Ei Aranya (2011)
 Apon Shatru(2011)
 Bangla Banchao (2011)
 Piya Tumi (2011)
 Run (2011)
 Ogo Bideshini (2011)
 Achena Prem (2011)
 Bhalo Meye Mondo Meye (2011)
 Dujone Milbo Abaar (2011)
 Best Friend (2011)
 Lorai (2011)
 Ki Kore Bojhabo Tomake (2012)
 Phire Eso Tumi (2012)
  "sare chuattor ghoshpara" (2013)
 Bloody Isshq (2013)

As a Background Music Composer 
 Bloody Isshq (2013)
 Love Birds (2011)

As a Playback Singer 
 Kakhono Biday Bolo Na (2010)

See also 
 Debojyoti Mishra
 Anjan Dutt

References

External links 
 

Indian film score composers
Living people
Bollywood playback singers
Year of birth missing (living people)
Place of birth missing (living people)
Indian male playback singers
Indian male film score composers
Musicians from West Bengal